The Battle of Xuzhou was fought in May 1938 as part of the Second Sino-Japanese War.

Japan 
The Japanese Order of battle

North China Front Army

Field Marshal Count Hisaichi Terauchi

16th Division - Lt. Gen. Keisuke Fujie	
 19th Infantry Brigade				
 9th Infantry Regiment				
 20th Infantry Regiment 				
 30th Infantry Brigade				
 33rd Infantry Regiment				
 38th Infantry Regiment				
 22nd Field Artillery Regiment			
 20th Cavalry Regiment					
 16th Engineer Regiment				
 16th Transport Regiment
 114th Division -Lt. Gen. Shigeji Suematsu
 127th Infantry Brigade
 66th Infantry Regiment
 115th Infantry Regiment
 128th Infantry Brigade
 102nd Infantry Regiment
 150th Infantry Regiment
 120th Field Artillery Regt
 118th Cavalry Regiment
 114th Engineer Regiment
 114th Transport Regiment
 3rd Infantry Brigade / 2nd Division - Major Gen. Kazuo Isa [2]
  4th Infantry Regiment
 29th Infantry Regiment
 13th Infantry Brigade / 7th Division - Major Gen. Tadao Yoshizawa [2]
 25th Infantry Regiment
 26th Infantry Regiment
Imada Detachment- Colonel Imada
 2nd Tank Battalion - Colonel Imada
 36 Type 89 Medium Tanks
 1st Battalion/9th Infantry Regiment/16th Division
 One mountain gun company
 One engineer platoon
 and other support units

2nd Army
Gen. Toshizō Nishio

5th Division - Gen. Seishirō Itagaki
 9th Infantry Brigade
 11th Infantry Regiment
 41st Infantry Regiment
 21st Infantry Brigade
 21st Infantry Regiment
 42nd Infantry Regiment
 5th Mountain Artillery Regiment
 5th Cavalry Regiment
 5th Engineer Regiment
 5th Transport Regiment
10th Division - Lt. Gen. Yoshio Shinozuka
 8th Infantry Brigade				
 39th Infantry Regiment				
 40th Infantry Regiment				
 33rd Infantry Brigade [Seya Detachment]				
 10th Infantry Regiment				
 63rd Infantry Regiment				
 10th Field Artillery Regiment			
 10th Cavalry Regiment				
 10th Engineer Regiment				
 10th Transport Regiment

Central China Expeditionary Force
Field Marshal Shunroku Hata

3rd Division- Gen. Lt. Gen. Susumu Fujita
 5th Infantry Brigade
 6th Infantry Regiment
 68th Infantry Regiment
 29th Infantry Brigade
 18th Infantry Regiment
 34th Infantry Regiment
 3rd Field Artillery Regiment
 3rd Cavalry Regiment
 3rd Engineer Regiment
 3rd Transport Regiment
 5th Tank Battalion - Colonel Hosomi (attached to support 3rd Division)
 32 Type 89 Medium Tanks
 15 Type 94 Tankettes
9th Division - Lt. Gen. Ryousuke Yoshizumi
 6th Infantry Brigade
 7th Infantry Regiment
 35th Infantry Regiment
 18th Infantry Brigade				
 19th Infantry Regiment
 36th Infantry Regiment
 9th Mountain Artillery Regiment
 9th Cavalry Regiment
 9th Engineer Regiment
 9th Transport Regiment
13th Division - Lt. Gen. Ryuhei Ogisu
 26th Infantry Brigade
 58th Infantry Regiment
 116th Infantry Regiment
 103rd Infantry Brigade
 65th Infantry Regiment
 104th Infantry Regiment(-)
 19th Mountain Artillery Regiment
 17th Cavalry Regiment
 13th Engineer Regiment
 13th Transport Regiment
Iwanaka Detachment- Colonel Iwanaka
 1st Tank Battalion - Colonel Iwanaka
 24 Type 89 Medium Tanks, 8 Type 94 Tankettes
 17th Independent Tankette Company
 1st Battalion / 104th Infantry Regiment / 13th Division
 One platoon of 19th Mountain Gun Regiment
 Part of 1st Independent Engineer Company
 One Independent Motorcar Company
 Part of 13th Divisional Signal Unit

Air Forces 

IJA Air Forces

North China 
 Temporary Aviation Army Corps
1st Hiko Daitai (Type 88 reconnaissance aircraft)
2nd Hiko Daitai (Kawasaki Ki-10 fighter)
5th Hiko Daitai (light bomber)
6th Hiko Daitai (Type 93 twin engine bomber)
7th Hiko Daitai (reconnaissance aircraft)
9th Hiko Daitai (light bomber)
3rd Independent squadron (large bomber)
9th Independent squadron (Kawasaki Ki-10 fighter)
1st Temporary independent squadron (Mitsubishi Ki-15)

Central China
3rd Flight Group
 1st independent squadron (reconnaissance aircraft)
 6th independent squadron (reconnaissance aircraft)
 10th independent squadron (Kawasaki Ki-10 fighters)
 8th Hiko Daitai (Ki-10 fighters)[4]

IJN  Air Forces
 12th Kōkūtai (predominantly fighter unit.)
 Fighter daitai - Mitsubishi A5M
 Attack daitai - Yokosuka B3Y1
Station: Daikojo (12/37 – 06/38), Anqing (06/38 – autumn/38)

 13th Kōkūtai (predominantly land attack unit.)
 Fighter daitai - Mitsubishi A5M
 Attack daitai - Yokosuka B3Y1, Mitsubishi G3M (land attack unit.)
Station:  Daikojo (12/37 – 03/38), Shanghai (04/38 – 11/40)

 14th Kōkūtai
 Fighter daitai - Mitsubishi A5M
 Bomber daitai - ?
 Attack daitai - ?
(Formed during April 1938.)
Station:  Sanqzao Island (04/38 – ?)

China

Army

5th War Area - Li Tsung-jen 
 2nd Army Group - Sun Lien-chung  From 1st War area March 1938
 30th Corps - Tien Chen-nan
 30th Division - Chang Cing-chao
 31st Division -  Chih Feng-cheng
 42nd Corps - Feng An-pang
 27th Division - Huang Chiao-sung
 44th Division - Wu Peng-chu
 3rd Army Group - Sun Tung-hsuen (acting)
 12th Corps - Sun Tung-hsuen
 20th Division - Sun Tung-hsuen
 81st Division - Chan Shu-tang
 55th Corps - Tsao Fu-lin
 29th Division - Tsao Fu-lin (concurrent)
 74th Division - Li Han-chang
 56th Corps - Ku Liang-min
 22nd Division - Ku Liang-min (concurrent)
 Pistol Brigade - Wu Hua-wen
 11th Army Group - Li Pin-hsien 
 31st  Corps - Wei Yung San
 131st Division - Chin Lien-fang
 135th Division - Su Tzu-hsing
 138th Division - Mo Teh-hung
 21st Army Group - Liao Lei 
 7th  Corps - Chou Tsu-huang
 170th  Division - Hsu Chi-ming
 171st Division - Yang Fu-chang
 172nd Division - Cheng Shu-feng
 48th  Corps - Liao Lei (concurrent)
 174th  Division - Wang Tsan-pin
 176th  Division - Ou Shou-nien
 22nd Army Group - Teng His-hou, (Sun Cheng - acting) [from Szechuan]
 41st Corps - Sun Cheng
 122nd  Division - Wang Ming-chang
 124th Division - Wang Shih-chun
 45th  Corps - Chen Ting-hsun
 125th  Division - Chen Ting-hsun (concurrent)
 127th  Division - Chen Li
 366 Division? [6] (peace preservation units?)
 372 Division? [6] (peace preservation units?)
 24th Army Group - Han The-chin (acting)
 57th  Corps - Miao Chen-liu
 111th Division - Chang En-tuo
 112th Division - Hou Shou-yi
 89th  Corps - Han Teh-chin (concurrent)
 33rd Division - Han Teh-chin (concurrent)
 117th Division - Li Shou-wei[6]
 attached Kiangsu Peace Preservation Units
 26th Army Group - Hsu Yuan-chuan (concurrent)
 10th Corps - Hsu Yuan-chuan (concurrent)
 41st Division - Ting Chih-pan
 48th Division -  Hsu Chi-wu
 199th Division -  Lo Shu-chia
 27th Army Group - Yang Sen
 20th Corps - Yang Sen (concurrent)
 133rd Division - Yang Han-yu
 134th Division - Yang Han-chung
 3rd Army - Pang Pin-hsun
 40th Corps - Pang Pin-hsun (concurrent)
 39th Division - Ma Fa-wu
 19th Army - Feng Chi-an
 77th Corps - Feng Chi-an (concurrent) 
 37th Division - Chia Chien-hsi
 179th  Division - Ho Chi-feng
 132nd  Division - Wang Chang-hai
 20th Army - Tang En-po
 52nd Corps - Kuan Lin-cheng
 2nd  Division - Cheng Tung-kuo[r]
 25th  Division - Chang Yao-ming[r]
 85th Corps - Wang Chung-lien
 4th  Division - Chen Ta-ching[r]
 89th  Division - Division - Hsueh-chung
 110th  Division - Chang Chen
 27th Army - Chang Tse-chung
 59th Corps - Chang Tse-chung (concurrent)  [From 1st War area Jan. 1938]
 38th Division - Huang Wei-kang
 180th Division - Liu Chen-san
 9th Division - Chang Teh-shun  Must be a different Division,  the 9th is below with 2nd Corps.
 13th Cav. Brigade - Yao Ching-chuan
 2nd Corps - Li Yen-nien
 3rd Division - Li Yu-tang 
 9th Division - Li Yen-nien(concurrent) 
 22nd Corps - Tan Tao-yuan
 50th Division - Chen Kuang-yu
 46th Corps - Fan Sung-pu
 28th Division - Tung Chao
 49th Division - Chou Shih-mein
 92nd Division - Huang Kuo-liang
 51st Corps - Yu Hsueh-chung 
 113th Division - Chao Kuang-lieh
 114th Division - Mu Chung-heng
 60th Corps - Lu Han
 182nd Division - An En-fu 
 183rd Division - Kao Kyin-huai 
 184th Division - Chang Chung 
 68th Corps - Liu Ju-ming 
 119th Division - Li Chin-tien
 143rd Division - Li Tseng-chih
 69th Corps - Shih Yu-san
 181st Division - Shih Yu-san (concurrent)
 New 6th  Division - Kao Shu-hsun
 75th Corps - Shih Yu-san
 6th Division - Shih Yu-san (concurrent) 
 93rd Division - Kan Li-chu
 92nd Corps - Li Hsien-chou
 13th Division - Wu Liang-shen
 21st Division - Li Hsien-chou (concurrent)
 95th Division - Lo Chi
 104th Division - Wang Wen-yen
 115 Division? 
 1st Regt. 1st Arty. Bde.
 4th, 5th,6th and 7th Art. Regt.

Airforce 
1st Air Route Command (ARC)
 Headquarters at Nanchang
 4th Pursuit Group based at Hankou - Mao Ying-Chu
 21st Pursuit Squadron - Captain Teng Ming-Teh
 22nd Pursuit Squadron - Zhang Wei-Hua
 Curtiss Hawk III
 23rd Pursuit Squadron - Liu Chung-Wu
 Polikarpov I-15bis
 24th Pursuit Squadron - Zhang Zhun
 Curtiss Hawk III

3rd Air Route Command 
 Headquarters at Sian
 17th Pursuit Squadron
 I-15bis based at Sian
 25th Pursuit Squadron
 I-15bis based at Sian
 3rd Pursuit Group - Lt. Colonel Wu Yu-Liu
 based at Hsaio Kan
 7th Pursuit Squadron - Xiang Yung
 I-15bis
 8th Pursuit Squadron -
 I-15bis

Sources

Battles of the Second Sino-Japanese War
Second Sino-Japanese War orders of battle